Jean-Marc Furlan (born 20 November 1957) is a French football manager and former player who played as a defender.

Club career
Born in Sainte-Foy-la-Grande, Furlan started his career at Bordeaux, where he signed his first professional contract in 1975, winning the Coupe Gambardella one year later. Furlan later also played for Stade Lavallois, Olympique Lyonnais, Tours FC, where he won promotion to the first division in the 1983–84 season, SC Bastia, Montpellier HSC, in which he achieved another promotion to the top-flight in the 1986–87 campaign, RC Lens and Saint-Seurin-sur-l'Isle, retiring there in 1993.

From 1976 to 1993, Furlan played as a sweeper in 420 professional games, 273 in Division 1 and 147 in Division 2.

Managerial career

Libourne
After retirement, Furlan later opened a sport shop. He felt the need to share his football passion and did so by volunteering as a coach for his son's little league team. His aim was to develop the talent of young players. Due to financial difficulties, the club merged into Libourne/Saint-Seurin and started over in CFA 2 (fifth tier).

Satisfied with the results of the Libourne youth team, Furlan was asked to manage the first-team squad from 1997 to 2004. This was a success; four seasons in a row, he guided Libourne to the round of 32 in the Coupe de France, eliminating Ligue 1 teams such as Olympique Lyonnais and FC Metz and making it to the quarter-finals. At the same time, Furlan achieved promotion from CFA 2 (fifth tier) to CFA (fourth tier) and then the National (third tier).

During his time at Libourne-Saint Seurin, Furlan was widely credited with having overseen the progress of youngsters such as Matthieu Chalmé and Mathieu Valbuena.

Troyes
Furlan's performances as a manager drew the attention of several professional teams. He signed his first professional contract as a manager with Ligue 2 side Troyes AC in the 2004–05 season. His first season was very successful as Troyes was promoted to Ligue 1 and he was personally awarded Manager of the Year, being considered to be a shrewd tactician with collective spirit made up of well-oiled offensive tactics.

Strasbourg
Furlan was appointed manager of RC Strasbourg from 2007 to 2009.

Nantes
Furlan took over as the new manager of FC Nantes in the 2009–10 season.

Return to Troyes

In the 2010–11 season, Furlan returned to Troyes and the team was promoted to Ligue 1 the following season. Again in the 2014–15 season, Furlan easily led the side to promotion to Ligue 1, with four games before the end of the season, as well as winning its first national title, Ligue 2. He left the club on 3 December 2015.

Brest
On 30 May 2016, Furlan became the new manager of Stade Brestois 29 for three years after Alex Dupont, the previous manager, failed to bring them back up to Ligue 1 after three years in command.

Despite a low budget in the teams he managed, Furlan developed the talent of very good players such as Damien Perquis, Bafétimbi Gomis, Blaise Matuidi, Djibril Sidibé, Mounir Obbadi and Fabrice N'Sakala.

On 17 May 2019, after Furlan had led Brest to a Ligue 1 promotion, his contract ran out.

Auxerre
He signed with Ligue 2 side AJ Auxerre the same day.

Managerial statistics

Honours

Player
Bordeaux
Coupe Gambardella: 1976

Tours
Division 2: 1983–84

Montpellier
Division 2: 1986–87

Manager

Libourne
Championnat de France Amateur 2: 1998–99
Championnat de France Amateur promotion: 1999–2000, 2002–03
Coupe d'Aquitaine: 2003–04

Troyes
Ligue 2: 2014–15, third place promotion: 2004–05, 2011–12

Brest
Ligue 2 runner-up: 2018–19

Individual
Ligue 2 Manager of the Year: 2004–05, 2014–15

References

External links
Jean-Marc Furlan profile at Footballdatabase.eu
Jean-Marc Furlan profile at Racingstub.com 
Jean-Marc Furlan profile at Le Figaro 

1957 births
Living people
Association football defenders
French footballers
FC Girondins de Bordeaux players
Stade Lavallois players
Olympique Lyonnais players
Tours FC players
SC Bastia players
Montpellier HSC players
RC Lens players
FC Libourne players
Ligue 1 players
Ligue 2 players
French football managers
ES Troyes AC managers
RC Strasbourg Alsace managers
FC Nantes managers
Stade Brestois 29 managers
AJ Auxerre managers
Ligue 1 managers
Ligue 2 managers